Manius Aemilius Lepidus may refer to:
 Manius Aemilius Lepidus (consul 66 BC)
 Manius Aemilius Lepidus (consul 11)